Salvia parryi (Parry's sage) is a perennial subshrub that is endemic to Northern Mexico (Sonora state), southwestern New Mexico, and southern Arizona, growing at  elevation.

Native people used preparations of the roots to treat gastric disorders. Parryin is a pimarane-derived diterpene isolated from this plant. Other compounds found in this species are isopimara-8(14),15-dien-7-one, isopimara-6,8(14),15-triene and isopimara-8,15-dien-7-one.

References

parryi
Flora of Mexico
Herbs